The Watertown Athletics were a minor league baseball team based in Watertown, New York.. The Athletics played from 1946 to 1951 and were preceded by the 1936 Watertown Greys and an 1888 Watertown team. Watertown teams played as members of the 1888 Eastern International League, 1936 Canadian–American League and Border League from 1946 to 1951. The Watertown Grays and Athletics hosted home games at Duffy Fairgrounds. Watertown was a minor league affiliate of the Boston Bees in 1936.

History
Minor league baseball started in Watertown, New York in 1888. The Watertown team played as a member of the four–team 1888 Eastern International League. On August 10, 1888, Watertown was in 2nd place in the league under manager Lee Kingsley when the team disbanded with 14–26 record, causing the league to fold.

Professional baseball returned in 1936, when the Watertown Grays, also known as the "Bucks,"  became charter members of the Class C level Canadian–American League, playing as an affiliate of the Boston Bees. Watertown drew 41 total fans on opening day in bad weather. Watertown finished with a record of 35–52 under manager Admiral Martin, placing 5th in the six–team Can-Am League. The league 1946 league standings also included the Brockville Pirates (43–36), Ogdensburg Colts (38–45), Oswego Netherlands (32–51), Ottawa Senators (53–37) and Perth Blue Cats/Royals (50–30). On June 24, 1936, Watertown had a record of 13–15 when the franchise briefly moved to Massena, New York before returning to Watertown. The Massena Grays compiled a 4–9 record while based in Massena, before the franchise relocated back to Watertown on July 12, 1936. The franchise folded after the 1936 season.

In 1946, minor league play resumed when the Watertown Athletics became charter members of the Class C level Border League. The six–team league standings featured the Auburn Cayugas (72–44), Granby Red Sox (54–60), Kingston Ponies (58–55), Ogdensburg Maples (50–68), Sherbrooke Canadians (46–71) and Watertown Athletics (69–51).

Watertown won the 1946 Border League Championship. The Athletics finished the regular season 69–51, placing 2nd in the league standings under manager Jim Scott. In the playoffs, the Watertown Athletics defeated the Granby Red Sox 3 games to 1. In the Finals, the Watertown Athletics defeated the Kingston Ponies 4 games to 2 to claim the championship. 1946 season attendance was 53,605, an average of 893.

The Watertown Athletics qualified for the 1947 playoffs. With a 70–54 regular season record to place 2nd in the Border League, manager Bob Shawkey led the team into the 1947 Playoffs. There, the Ogdensburg Maples defeated the Watertown Athletics 4 games to 3. Watertown season attendance was 53,600.

The 1948 Watertown Athletics advanced to the Border League Finals. Manager Fred Gerken led the team to a 63–65 record and a 4th place regular season finish. In the  Playoffs, the Watertown Athletics defeated the Geneva Robins 4 games to 3. In the Finals, the Ogdensburg Maples swept the Watertown Athletics 4 games 0. The season attendance was 65,590, an average of 1,025.

The Watertown Athletics finished with a record of 58–71, placing 5th in the 1949 Border League. Playing under manager Franklin Heller, the Athletics did not qualify for the playoffs. Their 1949 attendance was 61,026, averaging 946 per game.

The 1950 Watertown Athletics returned to the playoffs, led again by manager Franklin Heller. The Athletics placed 4th, with a 60–68 record in the Border League regular season standings, qualifying for the playoffs. In the playoffs, the Athletics fell in the first round of playoffs. The Ogdensburg Maples defeated the Watertown Athletics 4 games to 1. The Athletics had a total season attendance of 65,329, an average of 1,021 per game.

The Watertown Athletics folded midway through the 1951 season. On July 1, 1951, with a 22–30 record under manager Bob Shawkey, the Watertown franchise folded.> The season attendance to that date was 18,055, an average of 694. The Border League folded permanently on July 10, 1951.

Watertown next hosted another professional baseball team when the Watertown Pirates joined the New York-Penn League in 1983. Today, a summer collegiate baseball team, the Watertown Rapids, play as members of the Perfect Game Collegiate Baseball League.

The ballpark
The Watertown Athletics teams were noted to have played minor league home games at Duffy Fairgrounds. Still in use today, the ballpark is located at 970 Coffeen Street, Watertown, New York. The summer collegiate baseball team, the Watertown Rapids of the  Perfect Game Collegiate Baseball League are among the current tenants utilizing Duffy Fairgrounds.

Timeline

Year–by–year record

Notable alumni

Arnold Carter (1947)
Jim Devlin (1948, MGR)
Frank Fanovich (1947)
Hal Naragon (1948)
Jim Scott (1946, MGR)
Bob Shawkey (1947, 1951, MGR) 1912 AL ERA Leader

See also
Watertown Athletics players

References

External links
Watertown - Baseball Reference

Defunct minor league baseball teams
Watertown, New York
Boston Bees minor league affiliates
Defunct baseball teams in New York (state)
Baseball teams disestablished in 1951
Baseball teams established in 1946
Jefferson County, New York
Border League teams
Sports teams in Watertown, New York